IPSOS, meaning "themselves", is the magical formula of the Aeon of Ma'at as transmitted by Nema Andahadna in her inspired magical work, Liber Pennae Praenumbra. It is used by the Horus-Maat Lodge and Kenneth Grant's Typhonian Order.

Aeons
Within the system of Thelema, history is broken down into a series of Aeons, each with its own dominant concept of divinity and its own magical formula of redemption and advancement. According to Aleister Crowley, the last three Aeons have been the Aeon of Isis, the Aeon of Osiris and the current Aeon of Horus which began in 1904 with the writing of The Book of the Law. 

The future Aeon, which is seen to eventually replace the present one, is the Aeon of Ma'at. According to some, such as Charles Stansfeld Jones (Frater Achad), the Aeon of Ma'at has already arrived.

Meanings
According to Grant, the word IPSOS was received by initiates who were in communication with extraterrestrial intelligences. He equates the word with part of a cryptic cipher in Liber AL (II, 76), RPSTOVAL, by virtue of the fact that in the qabalistic art of  gematria, both evaluate to either 696 or 456, depending on whether an 'S' in each is taken as the Hebrew letter shin or samekh.

References

 

Magic words